Parascolopsis qantasi, commonly known as slender dwarf monocle bream, is a fish found in the Eastern Indian Ocean: known only from two specimens brought up in the Mentawi Strait, off western Sumatra, Indonesia.

Etymology
The fish is named in honor of Qantas Airlines, primarily to the staff of the Denpasar (Bali) office of the Australian airline, primarily because of the assistance given to Gloerfelt-Tarp.

References

Russell, B.C., 1990. FAO Species Catalogue. Vol. 12. Nemipterid fishes of the world. (Threadfin breams, whiptail breams, monocle breams, dwarf monocle breams, and coral breams). Family Nemipteridae. An annotated and illustrated catalogue of nemipterid species known to date. FAO Fish. Synop. 125(12):149p. Rome: FAO

Fish of the Indian Ocean
Taxa named by Barry C. Russell
Taxa named by Thomas Gloerfelt-Tarp
Fish described in 1984
Nemipteridae